UT, Ut or ut may refer to:

Arts and media

Music
 Ut, a musical note in Solfège which was replaced by do
Ut (band), a 1980s No Wave rock band
Ugly Things, a music magazine
Unbelievable Truth, a 1990s indie-pop band
Uncle Tupelo, an alternative country band

Other media
 UT (comics), a series of adult humour comic strips published in the UK
 The San Diego Union-Tribune, a U.S. newspaper
 Universal translator, in science fiction
 Unreal Tournament, a first-person shooter video game by Epic Games
 Undertale, a role-playing video game

Places
 Utah, a United States state identified by postal abbreviation
 Union territory, an administrative division in India
 Unorganized territory (disambiguation), a country subdivision

Universities

Asia
 University of Taipei, Taiwan
 University of Tehran, Iran
 Universitas Terbuka, Indonesia
 University of Tokushima, Japan
 University of Tokyo, Japan
 University of Toyama, Japan
 University of Tsukuba, Japan

Europe
 University of Tartu, Estonia
 University of Tirana, Albania
 University of Twente, Netherlands

North America
 University of Tampa, U.S.
 University of Tennessee, U.S.
 University of Texas at Austin, U.S.
 University of Texas System (UT System), U.S.
 University of Toledo, U.S.
 University of Toronto, Canada
 Universidad del Turabo, Puerto Rico, U.S.
 University of Utah, U.S.
 Utah Tech University, U.S.

Other uses
 Nick Ut, Pulitzer Prize winning photographer known for The Terror of War
 UTair Aviation (IATA code: UT), a Russian airline
 Union de Transports Aériens, IATA code UT until 1992
 Ultrasonic testing, testing based on the propagation of ultrasonic waves
 Unity Technologies, developer of the Unity game engine
 Universal Time, a standard time scale
 Utilitiesman (United States Navy), a Seabee occupational rating
 Urea transporter, a membrane transport protein transporting urea